Colin Love (9 June 1929 – 12 January 1998) was an Australian rules footballer who played with Melbourne in the Victorian Football League (VFL).

Notes

External links 

Demonwiki profile

1929 births
1998 deaths
Australian rules footballers from Victoria (Australia)
Melbourne Football Club players
Box Hill Football Club players
Box Hill Football Club coaches